Wuzhiqi is a supernatural being in Chinese mythology popularly depicted as a monkey-like aquatic demon and first described in the early 9th century.

Attestations
Wuzhiqi is also described in the Song dynasty anthology Taiping guangji as a "monkey-like demon" residing in the Huai River; it is defeated by Yu the Great and imprisoned under Turtle Mountain as part of his effort to control the Great Flood.

Influence
A cast-iron statue depicting Wuzhiqi was gifted to the German artist Hanna Bekker vom Rath and later housed at the Museum of Asian Art in Berlin. Described as the "most intriguing and puzzling gift" to the museum, it was only identified in 2001 by University of Hawaii professor Poul Andersen. Andersen also documented the emergence of Wuzhiqi-inspired cults in northern Anhui.

A popular argument first forwarded by Huang Zhigang offers that the Journey to the West protagonist Sun Wukong was modeled after Wuzhiqi. Anthony C. Yu writes in his unabridged translation of The Journey to the West that Wuzhiqi "has provided many scholars with a prototype of Sun Wukong" and that the author of Journey himself had "certainly" read of Wuzhiqi; in Chapter 66, it is referred to as the "Water Ape Great Sage" that had been brought to submission by the Preceptor of State-King Bodhisattva.

References

Notes

Citations

Bibliography
 
 
 
 

Asian demons
Yaoguai